Perales de Tajuña is a town and municipality of Spain located in the Community of Madrid. It is about 40 km to the southeast of Madrid in the area known as the Comarca de Las Vegas. The municipality covers 48.92 km,2 and it has a population of 2,738 inhabitants and a population density of 55.97 inhabitants/km2. To the north it borders with Arganda del Rey and Campo Real, to the east with Tielmes, to the south with Villarejo de Salvanés, and to the west with Morata de Tajuña and Valdelaguna.

Demographics

Education

In Perales de Tajuña there is one public nursery school and one infant and primary school, also public.

Architecture

Religious
 Parish church of Our Lady of the Castle
 Hermitage of San Isidro

Historical
 Town Hall
 Remains of watchtown and walls
 Ruins of Hermitage of San Sebastián
 Ruins of old hermitage of San Isidro
 Telegraph Tower-Fortress

Nature
 Risco de las Cuevas (Cliff caves)
 Prado de Arriba (Top field)

Fountains
 Mariblanca fountain
 Round fountain
 Barracks fountain
 Lagasca fountain
 Butrera fountain

Festivities
 San Blas, third of February
 Our Lady of the Castle, first Sunday of May
 San Isidro, fifteenth of May
 Town festival, month of August

Communications
Perales de Tajuña is well connected by road to Madrid and all the surrounding towns.
 From Madrid: R-3 (toll motorway) or A-3 (dual carriageway); Exits 33A, 35 or 41
 From Arganda del Rey: the old N-III
 From Campo Real: M-220
 From Morata de Tajuña: M-302
 From Tielmes, Carabaña, Orusco, Ambite: M-204
 From Valdelaguna: M-317
 From Villarejo de Salvanés: A-3, Exit 41

References

External links

 Official webpage of Perales de Tajuña Town Council in Spanish
 Madrid Region Statistical Office in Spanish

Municipalities in the Community of Madrid